Shelby County is located in the central portion of the U.S. state of Alabama. As of the 2020 census the population was 223,024. The county seat is Columbiana. Its largest city is Alabaster. The county is named in honor of Isaac Shelby, Governor of Kentucky from 1792 to 1796 and again from 1812 to 1816. Shelby County is included in the Birmingham–Hoover, AL Metropolitan Statistical Area.

History
Shelby County was established on February 7, 1818, and it was named for the Revolutionary War hero and the first Governor of Kentucky, Isaac Shelby. Beginning in 1820, the first county seat was located at Shelbyville. This long defunct settlement was located within the modern city limits of Pelham. The first courthouse was built of logs. The seat was moved to Columbia, now Columbiana, in 1826. Initially housed in an old school building, a new brick courthouse building was completed in 1854. It is now known as the Old Shelby County Courthouse and houses the Shelby County Museum and Archives. The current limestone courthouse was built from 1905 to 1906, at a cost of $300,000.

Shelby County has a long history in agriculture, and since about 1990, it has become an important location for growing soybeans, which has exceeded cotton as the most important crop grown there.

Shelby County was the home of an early inland waterway, the Coosa River, and it was also the location of a very early east–west railroad in Alabama that connected Atlanta, Georgia, with locations to its west. Shelby County was also crossed by an early north–south railroad, the Louisville and Nashville Railroad, that connected Louisville, Nashville, Decatur, Birmingham, and Montgomery.

With the advent of the automobile and the truck, Shelby County was soon crossed from north to south by U.S. Highway 31, the major one that followed the same route as the Louisville and Nashville Railroad did. (All odd-numbered U.S. Highways are north–south routes: e.g. U.S. 1, 11, 21, 31, 41, 51, 61, and 71, 101, going from East to West) The eastern part of Shelby County was later crossed by U.S. Highway 231 and U.S. 280.

Decades later, Shelby County was crossed by Interstate Highway 65. Hence, an important ingredient in the eventual growth of Shelby County has been its ready access to modern systems of transportation. Interstate 65 and U.S. Highway 31 have long provided strong connections between Shelby county and the more populous Jefferson County directly to its north, leading to suburban development in towns such as Pelham, Helena, Alabaster, and Chelsea.

Geography

Parts of Shelby County are crossed by the southernmost extensions of the Appalachian Mountains, such as Oak Mountain and Double Oak Mountain. However, large parts of Shelby County are much flatter, giving good land for farms and pastures. Shelby County also has lowlands along two rivers, and one large man-made reservoir, Lay Lake, which also borders Coosa, Talladega and Chilton counties.

Most of Shelby County is drained either by the Cahaba River, which flows along the northern edge of the county, and then to the southwest, or by the Coosa River, whose valley includes the eastern end of the county. These are both important rivers in Alabama. Much farther south, both the Cahaba River and the Coosa River flow into the Alabama River, and thence to the Gulf of Mexico. To be more precise, the Coosa River and the Tallapoosa River flow together at Wetumpka, Alabama, to form the Alabama River, and then the Cahaba River is a tributary to that one farther to the west. Waxahatchee Creek, a major tributary of the Coosa River, forms the southeastern portion of the border between Shelby County and Chilton County.

Adjacent counties
 St. Clair County (northeast)
 Talladega County (east)
 Coosa County (southeast)
 Chilton County (south)
 Bibb County (southwest)
 Jefferson County (northwest)

Demographics

2000 census
At the 2000 census, there were 143,293 people, 54,631 households, and 40,590 families living in the county. The population density was 180 people per square mile (70/km2). There were 59,302 housing units at an average density of 75 per square mile (29/km2). The racial makeup of the county was 89.80% White, 7.40% Black or African American, 0.33% Native American, 1.03% Asian, 0.02% Pacific Islander, 0.71% from other races, and 0.72% from two or more races. 2.03% of the population were Hispanic or Latino of any race.

The largest self-reported ancestry groups in Shelby County are: English (16.3%), Irish (13.3%), "American" (mostly English and Scots-Irish) (11.5%), German (11.0%), Italian (4.2%), Scots-Irish (4.2%) and Scottish (3.9%).

Of the 54,631 households 36.70% had children under the age of 18 living with them, 63.60% were married couples living together, 8.10% had a female householder with no husband present, and 25.70% were non-families. 21.70% of households were one person and 5.20% were one person aged 65 or older. The average household size was 2.59 and the average family size was 3.04.

The age distribution was 26.30% under the age of 18, 8.20% from 18 to 24, 33.70% from 25 to 44, 23.40% from 45 to 64, and 8.50% 65 or older. The median age was 35 years. For every 100 females, there were 96.20 males. For every 100 females age 18 and over, there were 92.60 males.

The median household income was $55,440 and the median family income  was $64,105. Males had a median income of $45,798 versus $31,242 for females. The per capita income for the county was $27,176. About 4.60% of families and 6.30% of the population were below the poverty line, including 7.10% of those under age 18 and 8.20% of those age 65 or over.

2010 census
At the 2010 census, there were 195,085 people, 74,072 households, and 53,733 families living in the county. The population density was 249 people per square mile (96/km2). There were 80,970 housing units at an average density of 103 per square mile (40/km2). The racial makeup of the county was 83.0% White, 10.6% Black or African American, 0.3% Native American, 1.9% Asian, 0.0% Pacific Islander, 2.8% from other races, and 1.4% from two or more races. 5.9% of the population were Hispanic or Latino of any race.

The largest self-identified ancestry groups in Shelby County were
 English – 15.8%
 Irish – 13.9%
 German – 11.1%
 American – 11.0%
 African American - 10.6%
 Italian – 4.3%
 Scots-Irish – 3.9%
 Scottish – 3.7%
 French (except Basque) – 2.7%
 Polish – 1.5%
 Dutch – 1.3%
 Welsh – 0.8%
 Swedish – 0.7%
 Arab – 0.6%
 Norwegian – 0.5%
 Greek – 0.4%

Of the 74,072 households 34.3% had children under the age of 18 living with them, 59.7% were married couples living together, 9.4% had a female householder with no husband present, and 27.5% were non-families. 23.2% of households were one person and 6.2% were one person aged 65 or older. The average household size was 2.60 and the average family size was 3.08.

The age distribution was 25.6% under the age of 18, 7.8% from 18 to 24, 29.2% from 25 to 44, 26.9% from 45 to 64, and 10.6% 65 or older. The median age was 36.9 years. For every 100 females, there were 96.0 males. For every 100 females age 18 and over, there were 95.0 males.

The median household income was $68,380 and the median family income was $81,406. Males had a median income of $57,405 versus $41,692 for females. The per capita income for the county was $33,978. About 5.4% of families and 7.4% of the population were below the poverty line, including 10.3% of those under age 18 and 4.9% of those age 65 or over.

2020 census

As of the 2020 United States census, there were 223,024 people, 84,048 households, and 57,918 families residing in the county.

Politics
Prior to the early 1980s, elected officials serving or representing Shelby County were all affiliated with the Democratic Party, although at a national level the county often supported Republicans even during the "Solid South" era – it was one of four counties in Alabama to vote for Theodore Roosevelt over Woodrow Wilson in 1912. Most of the rapid transition from the Democratic Party dominance to a complete reversal, with Republicans in control of all but a couple of offices, took place during the years between 1984 and 1992. It was not until the election of 2010, and specifically the results in Alabama House of Representatives District 42, that Republicans held every party-identified elected office with jurisdiction or residency (or both) in Shelby County. (In Alabama, municipal officials are elected on a non-partisan basis.)

The Shelby County Republican Party, under the official direction of the Republican Executive Committee of Shelby County, Alabama, is the affiliate of the Alabama Republican Party in Shelby County, and is the identity by which its governing body is known.

In 2013, the county was the plaintiff in Shelby County v. Holder, which struck down portions of the Voting Rights Act of 1965 as unconstitutional.

Education
Shelby County Schools operates public schools in the county. Alabaster City Schools operates the six public schools in Alabaster. In 2014, Pelham began operating their own school system with three schools taken over from the Shelby County School System: Pelham High School, Riverchase Middle School, and Valley Elementary School. On May 5, 2015, ground was broken for the construction of Pelham Ridge Elementary School  which opened during the 2016–2017 school year. Also that year, Valley Elementary School closed and teachers relocated to Valley Intermediate School, renamed Pelham Oaks Elementary School (now serving kindergarten through fifth grade).

Transportation

Major highways

  Interstate 65
  U.S. Highway 31
  U.S. Highway 231
  U.S. Highway 280
  State Road 25
  State Road 70
  State Road 76
  State Road 119
  State Road 145
  State Road 155
  State Road 261

Railroads
 CSX Transportation
 Norfolk Southern Railway
 Calera & Shelby Railroad

Airports
 Shelby County Airport – General Aviation
 Birmingham-Shuttlesworth International Airport – Commercial passenger and freight service in an adjacent county Jefferson County

Communities

Cities

 Alabaster
 Birmingham (mostly in Jefferson County)
 Calera (partly in Chilton County)
 Chelsea
 Columbiana (county seat)
 Helena (partly in Jefferson County)
 Hoover (partly in Jefferson County)
 Leeds (partly in Jefferson County and St. Clair County)
 Montevallo
 Pelham
 Vestavia Hills (partly in Jefferson County)
 Vincent (partly in St. Clair County and Talladega County)

Towns

 Harpersville
 Indian Springs Village
 Westover
 Wilsonville
 Wilton

Census-designated places

 Brantleyville (a village west of Alabaster)
 Brook Highland
 Dunnavant (a village northeast of Chelsea)
 Eagle Point
 Highland Lakes
 Meadowbrook
 Pea Ridge
 Shelby (a village east of Calera)
 Shoal Creek
 Sterrett (a village northwest of Vincent)
 Vandiver (a village northeast of Chelsea)

Unincorporated communities

 Abbot Springs
 Acton
 Aldrich
 Arkwright
 Calcis
 Cloverdale
 Fourmile
 Inverness
 Maylene
 Nelson
 Ryan
 Saginaw
 Siluria (a neighborhood of Alabaster)

Places of interest
 Aldrich Coal Mine Museum
 American Village
 Cahaba River Wildlife Management Area
 Colonial Promenade Alabaster
 Heart of Dixie Railroad Museum
 Indian Springs School
 Oak Mountain Amphitheatre
 Oak Mountain State Park
 Old Shelby County Courthouse and Museum
 Shelby Iron Works Park

See also
 National Register of Historic Places listings in Shelby County, Alabama
 Properties on the Alabama Register of Landmarks and Heritage in Shelby County, Alabama

References

Notes

External links

 
 Shelby County Web Portal
 Shelby County 9-1-1 System
 Shelby County article, Encyclopedia of Alabama
 Shelby County Republican Party
 Shelby County Digital Guide

 
1818 establishments in Alabama Territory
Populated places established in 1818
Birmingham metropolitan area, Alabama
Counties of Appalachia